Norgrove is a surname. Notable people with the surname include:

David Norgrove, British businessman
Linda Norgrove, British aid worker killed in Afghanistan, see Death of Linda Norgrove
Michael Norgrove, Zambian-born British boxer
Norgrove Family, Irish republican family involved in the Easter Rising

See also
Norgrove Court, a stately home